Jean-Paul Roux, PhD (5 January 1925 – 29 June 2009) was a French Turkologist and a specialist in Islamic culture.

He was a graduate of the Institut national des langues et civilisations orientales, the École du Louvre, and the École Pratique des Hautes Études. In 1966 he was awarded a doctorate in literature in Paris. He was director of research at CNRS from 1957 to 1970, the Science Secretary for the Department of Oriental Languages and Civilizations from 1960 to 1966, and a teacher of Islamic art at the École du Louvre. He was General Commissioner for the Islamic Arts at the Orangerie de Tuileries in 1971 and also at the Grand Palais in 1977. Jean-Paul Roux's Genghis Khan and the Mongol Empire (2003) has been described as an "admirable short introduction" by historian David Morgan.

Publications
Gengis Khan et l'Empire mongol, collection « Découvertes Gallimard » (nº 422), série Histoire. Paris: Éditions Gallimard (2002)
 US edition – Genghis Khan and the Mongol Empire, "Abrams Discoveries" series. New York: Harry N. Abrams (2003)
 UK edition – Genghis Khan and the Mongol Empire, 'New Horizons' series. London: Thames & Hudson (2003)
Montagnes sacrées, montagnes mythiques  (1999)
L'Asie centrale, histoire et civilisation (1997)   
Le roi, mythes et symbole (1995)
Histoire de l'empire mongol (1993)
Tamerlan (1991)
Jésus (1989)
Le sang. Mythes, symboles et réalités  (1988)
Babur, histoire des Grands Moghols (1986)
Histoire des Turcs (1984)
Les explorateurs au Moyen Âge  (1985, written with Sylvie-Anne Roux )
La Religion des Turcs et des Mongols (1984)
Mustafa Kemal et la Turquie nouvelle (1983)
Les traditions des nomades de la Turquie méridionale : contribution à l'étude des représentations religieuses des sociétés turques d'après les enquêtes effectuées chez les Yörük et les Tahtaci (1969)
Faune et flore sacrées dans les sociétés altaïques (1966)
La mort (la survie) chez les peuples altaïques anciens et médiévaux d'après les documents écrits (1963)

References
 BiblioMonde

Notes

Historians of Islamic art
University of Paris alumni
1925 births
Mongolists
Turkologists
2009 deaths
French male non-fiction writers
20th-century French historians
20th-century French male writers
Recipients of the Order of Merit of the Republic of Turkey